Yorkton Regional High School (also known as the YRHS or The Regional) is located in Yorkton, Saskatchewan.

The Regional opened its doors on November 10, 1967.  2007 was the 40th anniversary of the YRHS.
  
The school color is orange.

The YRHS team mascot is "Colonel Raider."

The YRHS Marching 100 marching band was the only Canadian representative in the 1998 Tournament of Roses parade in Pasadena, CA.

The YRHS Jazz 1 band represented the country at the Montreux Jazz Festival in Switzerland on July 7, 2006. Just days previous to that, the band took third place in the Vienna International Youth Music Festival.

The Yorkton Regional High School has been number 1 in Canada in the QSP Magazine Campaign for 17 years in a row, each year bringing in over $100,000, going directly towards extra-curricular activities and events at the school.

In 1985, Yorkton Regional High School hosted the very first Canadian Student Leadership Conference (CLSC). This event has taken place every year since and returned to Yorkton in 1995.

In May 2017, a student from Yorktown Regional High School had their name mentioned on American Top 40. The person's name was also mentioned the school's name to their song request. The students were also listening to it on air from various platforms during the weekend.

External links
Yorkton Regional High School Website 

High schools in Saskatchewan
Educational institutions established in 1967
Yorkton
1967 establishments in Saskatchewan